Diaphorodoris luteocincta is a species of sea slug, a dorid nudibranch, a shell-less marine gastropod mollusc in the family Calycidorididae.

Distribution
This species was described from Vallø (Tønsberg), Norway. It is reported from Norway south along the Atlantic Ocean coasts of Europe to the Mediterranean Sea.

Description
The maximum recorded body length is 8 mm.

References

External links
 

Onchidorididae
Gastropods described in 1870